In non-equilibrium thermodynamics, GENERIC is an acronym for General Equation for Non-Equilibrium Reversible-Irreversible Coupling. It is the general form of dynamic equation for a system with both reversible and irreversible dynamics (generated by energy and entropy, respectively). GENERIC formalism is the theory built around the GENERIC equation, which has been proposed in its final form in 1997 by Miroslav Grmela and Hans Christian Öttinger.

GENERIC equation

The GENERIC equation is usually written as

Here:
  denotes a set of variables used to describe the state space. The vector  can also contain variables depending on a continuous index like a temperature field. In general,  is a function , where the set  can contain both discrete and continuous indexes. Example:  for a gas with nonuniform temperature, contained in a volume 
 ,  are the system's total energy and entropy.
In the discrete case, it is simply the gradient, for continuous variables, it is the functional derivative (a function )
 the Poisson matrix  is an antisymmetric matrix (possibly depending on the continuous indexes) describing the reversible dynamics of the system according to Hamiltonian mechanics. The related Poisson bracket fulfills the Jacobi identity.
 the friction matrix  is a positive semidefinite (and hence symmetric) matrix describing the system's irreversible behaviour.

In addition to the above equation and the properties of its constituents, systems that ought to be properly described by the GENERIC formalism are required to fulfill the degeneracy conditions

which express the conservation of entropy under reversible dynamics and of energy under irreversible dynamics, respectively.

References

Non-equilibrium thermodynamics